To You Sweetheart, Aloha is the fourth studio album by American pop singer Andy Williams and was released late in the summer of 1959 by Cadence Records. This, his fourth LP for the label, has a Hawaiian theme that coincides with the admission of the 50th of the United States.

One of the songs on this album, "Hawaiian Wedding Song", was originally recorded and released as a single in 1958 and stayed on the pop chart for 20 weeks, peaking at number 11.  It was included on his last album, Two Time Winners, as were two other songs from this album, "Blue Hawaii" and "Sweet Leilani". Both of those songs, however, were rerecorded for this album while the hit single was not.

The album was reissued with the title The Hawaiian Wedding Song in 1965 by Columbia Records and entered the Top LP's chart in Billboard magazine's May 22 issue that year and reached number 61 during its 18 weeks there.

To You Sweetheart, Aloha was released on compact disc for the first time as one of two albums on one CD by Collectables Records on September 12, 2000, the other album being a 1962 Cadence compilation entitled Million Seller Songs.  Collectables included this CD in a box set entitled Classic Album Collection, Vol. 1, which contains 17 of his studio albums and three compilations and was released on June 26, 2001. This album was also released on compact disc with four bonus tracks after being digitally remastered by Varèse Sarabande in 2001. Three of those four ("Blue Hawaii", "Sweet Leilani", and "Love Letters in the Sand") were recorded for the Two Time Winners album, and the fourth ("House of Bamboo") was the B-side of "Hawaiian Wedding Song".

Reception

Allmusic's William Ruhlmann pointed out that Cadence Records head and orchestra conductor Archie Bleyer "eschewed the usual practice of employing traditional Hawaiian instruments and importing the islands' musicians, settling instead for Hawaiian-styled arrangements played by a standard orchestra." Ruhlmann emphasized, however, that "what mattered was Williams's typically warm vocal interpretations, which made the album a romantic touchstone."

Billboard gave the album a favorable review. "Here's a tasteful, restful package of familiar Hawaiian themes, sung with relaxed showmanship and rich vocal quality by Williams."

Track listing

Side one
 "To You Sweetheart, Aloha" (Harry Owens) - 2:50
 "Blue Hawaii" (Ralph Rainger, Leo Robin) - 1:59
 "I'll Weave a Lei of Stars for You" (Robert Alexander Anderson, Harry Owens) - 2:18
 "Sweet Leilani" (Harry Owens) - 2:34
 "Moon of Manakoora" (Frank Loesser, Alfred Newman) - 2:48
 "The Hawaiian Wedding Song" (Al Hoffman, Charles E. King, Dick Manning) - 2:29

Side two
 "Song of the Islands" (Charles E. King) - 2:21
 "A Song of Old Hawaii" (Gordon Beecher, Johnny Noble) - 2:32
 "Love Song of Kalua" (Ken Darby) - 2:23
 "Beyond the Reef" (Jack Pitman) - 3:05
 "Ka-Lu-A" (Anne Caldwell, Jerome Kern) - 2:34
 "Aloha ‘Oe (Farewell to Thee)" (Liliuokalani) - 2:25

CD bonus tracks

 "Blue Hawaii" (Ralph Rainger, Leo Robin) - 2:03
 "Sweet Leilani" (Harry Owens) - 2:22
 "Love Letters in the Sand" (J. Fred Coots, Charles Kenny, Nick Kenny) - 2:32
 "House of Bamboo" (William Crompton, Norman Murrells) - 2:06

Grammy nomination

The single "Hawaiian Wedding Song" brought the first of six Grammy nominations that Williams received over the course of his career, this time in the category for Best Vocal Performance, Male. The winner was Perry Como for "Catch a Falling Star".

Song information

"Ka-Lu-A" originated in the 1921 musical Good Morning, Dearie and reached number three on the charts the following year as a duet between Elsie Baker (who was credited as Edna Brown) and Elliott Shaw.  "Aloha ‘Oe (Farewell to Thee)" charted for one week at number 10 as an instrumental recording by Ferera's Hawaiian Instrumental Quintet in 1924.

"Song of the Islands" first charted as an instrumental recording by Wayne King & His Orchestra that peaked at number 12 in 1930, and then as a vocal performance by Bing Crosby in 1936 that got as high as number 14. Crosby's recording of "The Moon of Manakoora" debuted on the charts in February 1938 and eventually made it to number 10, and a rendition of the song by Ray Noble & His Orchestra with Tony Martin on vocal came onto the charts that March and reached number 15.

Dick Todd entered the charts with "To You Sweetheart, Aloha" in 1940 and got as high as number 10.  Crosby's recording of "Beyond the Reef" reached number 26 on Billboard magazine's list of the Most Played Juke Box Records in 1950. And as of the release of To You Sweetheart, Aloha, "A Song of Old Hawaii" had already been recorded by Bing Crosby, Dorothy Lamour, and Tony Martin.

Personnel

Original album

Andy Williams – vocalist
Archie Bleyer – orchestra conductor
Carlyle Hall – arranger

Varèse Sarabande reissue
From the liner notes for the 2001 CD:

Cary Mansfield – producer
Marty Wekser – producer; mastering
Evren Goknar – mastering
Joseph Lanza – liner notes
Bill Pitzonka – art direction & design
Greg Yantek – additional photo courtesy

References

Bibliography

External links
 To You Sweetheart, Aloha - Andy Williams Review with music samples

1959 albums
Andy Williams albums
Cadence Records albums
Albums conducted by Archie Bleyer